Adithyapuram Surya Temple is a Hindu temple located in Iravimangalam near Kaduthuruthy in Kottayam district in the Indian state of Kerala. It is noted mainly as the only 'Adithya' (Hindu solar deity) shrine in the state. The temple is situated just  from the main highway leading to Vaikom. It is about 3 km from Kaduthuruthy, 17 km from Ettumanoor and 16 km from Vaikom.

Legend 
Legend has it that the idol of Surya Deva was consecrated during the Treta Yuga. But there are no much factual evidences behind the origin of the temple. Once a Nambudiri who belonged to the 'Kapikkadu Marangattu Mana'  performed a deep meditation or 'Tapas' to please the Sun God 'Adithya'. Pleased by the devotion, Adithya appeared before him and instructed him to consecrate an idol in the place. From that time onwards, regular pujas and rituals were started. At present, descendants of that Nambudiri holds the tantric rights of the temple.

Temple 
The 'Sreekovil' or the sanctum sanctorum of the temple is in a circular shape. The idol faces west with a meditative posture. It is made of a special kind of stone that has the capability to absorbe oil. 'Abhishekam' or the holy bathing of idol is performed in morning followed by the abhishekam of water. It is really a wonder that there will be no presence of oil after sprinkling water in the idol. The upper right hand holds the 'Chakra' (rotating disk) and the upper left hand holds the 'Shankha' (conch) and the lower right and left hands are in a 'tapo mudra' posture. An interesting fact is that there are no 'Navagraha' pratishtas here.

Poojas 
Adithyapooja (for curing eye and skin related diseases), Udayasthamana pooja, Enna (oil) Abhishekam, Bhagavathi pooja and Navagraha (9  planet deities) pooja are the most important poojas in the temple.

Offerings 
'Ada Nivedyam' and 'Raktha Chandana samarppanam' are the main offerings often done to cure diseases.

Festivals 
The last Sundays of Malayalam months 'Vrishchikam' (October and November) and 'Medam' (May and June) are considered to be the most propitious days.

Rituals 
Special rituals such as 'Abhishekam' and 'Rakthachandana Kaavadi' are performed on the festive occasions. There is also a custom that one member from the Marangattu Illam must participate in the Kaavadi.

Deities 
Apart from Surya Deva, Devi (facing east), Sastha and Yakshi are the sub deities.

References 

Hindu temples in Kottayam district
Surya temples
Vaikom